Charles Green (1893 – November 27, 1935) was an American jazz musician, who was born in Omaha, Nebraska, and died in New York City. He was one of the early jazz trombonists and the soloist in the Fletcher Henderson orchestra (joining slightly before Louis Armstrong).

Biography
He played locally in Omaha between 1920 and 1923, before his two stints with Henderson (July 1924 and April 1926; and late 1928 to early 1929). Described as "a superior blues player who could also swing fairly early", Green played on several Bessie Smith recordings, notably "Trombone Cholly" featuring his trombone and biographical lyrics praising his playing, and the notorious "Empty Bed Blues" which features the "dirty moaning" of his playing.

Green also recorded in the 1920s with several other blues singers, and worked with the bands of Benny Carter (1929–1931 and 1933), Chick Webb (several times during 1930-1934), Jimmie Noone (1931), Don Redman (1932) and at the end with Kaiser Marshall. In 1928, Green played in the orchestra of the revue Keep Shufflin''' together with Fats Waller and James P. Johnson.

According to jazz historian John Chilton (in his book Who's Who of Jazz) Green's premature death was from passing out on his doorstep in Harlem on a cold February night after having been unable to get into his home, and thus freezing to death. This story was  disputed by Frederick J. Spencer, M.D., in his book Jazz and Death, Medical Profiles of Jazz Greats.

A folk song, known by various names, was recorded as "Charley Green, Play That Slide Trombone", by Jim Croce and appears on the albums Facets (1966) and The Faces I've Been (1975). It has also been performed and recorded by Bessie Smith (as "Trombone Cholly"), Hoyt Axton and the Chicago area folksinger, Jim Craig.

References

Bibliography
 John Chilton, Who's Who of Jazz (5th edition, London 1989), 
 Brian Rust, Jazz Records 1897-1942'' (5th edition, Chigwell, Essex 1983), 

1893 births
1935 deaths
American jazz trombonists
Male trombonists
Jazz-blues musicians
20th-century American musicians
20th-century trombonists
20th-century American male musicians
American male jazz musicians